Alan Agustín Matturro Romero (born 11 October 2004) is a Uruguayan professional footballer who plays as a centre-back for Italian  club Genoa.

Early and personal life
Matturro was born in Montevideo to a family of Italian descent; Matturro's ancestors originated from Balvano in the province of Potenza, thus holds an Italian passport. In July 2021, Matturro's mother, Silvana, passed away from complications of SARS-CoV-2.

Club career
Matturro is a youth academy graduate of Defensor Sporting. He joined the club at the age of 12 as a centre-forward.

On 21 December 2022, Matturro joined Italian club Genoa.

International career
Matturro is a Uruguayan youth international. He has represented Uruguay at 2019 South American U-15 Championship.

Career statistics

Honours
Defensor Sporting
 Copa Uruguay: 2022

References

External links

2004 births
Living people
Footballers from Montevideo
Association football defenders
Uruguayan footballers
Uruguay youth international footballers
Defensor Sporting players
Genoa C.F.C. players
Uruguayan Primera División players
Uruguayan Segunda División players
Uruguayan expatriate footballers
Expatriate footballers in Italy
Uruguayan expatriate sportspeople in Italy